Ialtris parishi, the Tiburon banded racer or Parish's fanged snake, is a species of snake in the family Colubridae.  The species is native to Haiti.

References

Ialtris
Reptiles of Haiti
Endemic fauna of Haiti
Reptiles described in 1932